is a Japanese muay thai kickboxer. A professional competitor since 2008, he is the former KNOCK OUT Lightweight champion and the former WPMF and WBC Muaythai Japan featherweight champion.

Professional career

Early career
Morii made his professional debut against Koki Oonishi at AJKF CUB☆KICK’S－9 on February 9, 2008. The fight was ruled a draw by majority decision. Morii was then booked to face Yuichiro Katsumata at M-1 FAIRTEX SINGHA BEERFreshmans in Oomori on April 6, 2008. He won the fight by unanimous decision. Morii returned to AJKF at AJKF Norainu Dengekisakusen on June 22, 2008, to face Rikiya Oomae. He won the fight by unanimous decision.

Morii faced Fudo Myo-o at AJKF Fighting Base 1 on August 22, 2008. He won the fight by a second-round knockout, flooring Myo-o with a left hook. After notching the first stoppage victory of his career, Morii faced Hayato Uesugi at AJKF Fighting Base 2 on October 3, 2008. He won the fight by unanimous decision. Morii made his sixth appearance of the year against Takahiro Horiguchi at AJKF Fujiwara Matsuri 2008 on December 5, 2008. He won the fight by unanimous decision.

Morii participated in the Krush K-1 rules Rookies Cup, the quarter and semifinals of which were held on February 1, 2009. Morii faced Rikiya Oomae in the first bout of the tournament, and beat him by a unanimous decision, with all three judges scoring the fight 30–28 in his favor. Advancing to the tournament semifinals, Morii faced Mitsutoshi Kurata. He won the fight by a second-round knockout, stopping Kurata with a right hook to the body. Morii faced Takuya Shirahama in the tournament finals on March 14, 2009. He lost the fight by unanimous decision, with all three judges scoring the fight 29–27 for Shirahama.

Morii faced Makoto Kushima at AJKF Norainu Dengekisakusen 2009 on June 21, 2009. He won the fight by a third-round technical knockout. Morii was next booked to face Takeyuki at Krush Lightweight Grand Prix 2009～ Round.1 on July 24, 2009. He won the fight by unanimous decision, with all three judge awarding him a 30–26 scorecard. Morii made his second consecutive Krush appearance against Hiroshi Iwakiri at Krush-EX ～Innocent Fighter～ on October 12, 2009. He won the fight by unanimous decision.

Regional muaythai championships
Morii faced Hideya Nagasaki at Fujiwara Matsuri 2009 on December 11, 2009. He won the fight by unanimous decision, with all three judges scoring the fight 30–28 in his favor. Morii next faced Kenshiro Chiba at Tanikawa Gym 25th Anivversary BigBang on March 28, 2010. He won the fight by a second-round knockout. Morii was booked to face Kompayak Weerasakreck at M-1 RAJA BOXING SINGHA BEER Muay Thai Challenge NAI KANOMTOM vol.2 on June 6, 2010. He won the fight by unanimous decision, with all three judges scoring the fight 29–26 for him. Morii faced Ryo Pegasus, in his third fight of the year, at M-1 FAIRTEX　Singha Beer Muay Thai Challenge NAI KANOMTOM vol.3 on September 12, 2010.

WPMF Japan featherweight champion
Morii was booked to face Reio for the interim WPMF Japan featherweight title at Fujiwara Matsuri 2010 on December 1, 2010. He won the fight by a first-round technical knockout, after knocking Reio down three times by the 2:55 minute mark of the opening rounds. Morii was booked to unify the WPMF titles with the regular champion Hiroki Nagashima at M-1 FAIRTEX RAORAK　MUAY vol.1 on April 10, 2011. He won the fight by a fifth-round technical knockout, as the fight was stopped by the ringside physician due to a cut above Nagashima's left eye.

Morii faced Suwannoi Acegym at M-1 FAIRTEX RAORAK　MUAY vol.2 on June 12, 2011. The fight was ruled a draw by split decision. Morii next faced the former WBO super bantamweight champion Ratanachai Sor.Vorapin at M-1 FAIRTEX RAORAK　MUAY vol.3 on September 11, 2011. He won the fight by a first-round knockout, stopping Ratanachai with a right low kick. Morii made his REBELS debut against Kuwanek Kitakampon at REBELS 9 on October 23, 2011. He won the fight by a third-round knockout. Morii was then booked to face Genji Umeno at Fujiwara Matsuri 2011 Fuyu no Jin on December 12, 2011. He lost the fight by unanimous decision, with all three judges awarding all five rounds of the bout to Umeno.

WPMF and WBC Japan featherweight champion
Morii challenged the reigning WBC Muaythai Japan featherweight champion Heihachi Nakajima at NJKF KICK TO THE FUTURE 2 on April 29, 2012. He won the fight by a fifth-round knockout. Morii faced Masato Sato in a non-title bout at M-1 Sutt Yod Muaythai vol.2 on June 24, 2012. He won the fight by unanimous decision. Morii made his first WPMF Japan featherweight title defense against Hiroki Nagashima at REBELS 12 on July 29, 2012. The bout was a rematch of their April 10, 2011 meeting, which Morii won by a fifth-round technical knockout. Morii successfully retained his title by a narrow unanimous decision, with scores of 49–48, 48–47 and 49–48.

Morii was booked to make his first WBC Muaythai featherweight title defense against Hiroki Akimoto at MA Japan Kick BREAK-30 ～UNIFICATION～ on October 7, 2012. He lost the fight by unanimous decision, with scores of 49–48, 49–47 and 50–47. After failing in his first title defense, Morii was scheduled to face Pornsanae Sitmonchai at RISE/M-1 ~Infinity.II~ on January 6, 2013. The fight was ruled a split decision draw. Morii made his second WPMF Japan featherweight title defense against SHIGERU at M-FIGHT, Part.2 on May 25, 2013. He lost the fight by majority decision.

Morii faced Munfang Por.Poonsawan at MAX MUAYTHAI 2013 JAPAN on October 6, 2013. He won the fight by a second-round knockout.

First kickboxing titles

BigBang
Morii faced Shunta for the inaugural BigBang Super Featherweight title at BigBang 15 on December 1, 2013, in his promotional debut. He won the fight by a fifth-round knockout. After successfully capturing his first kickboxing title, Morii was booked to face Rungpet Kaiyanghadao in a non-title bout at Fujiwara Matsuri on June 19, 2014. He won the fight by a second-round spinning elbow knockout. Morii made his first BigBang title defense against Fire Hiroshi at BigBang 18 on September 7, 2014. He won the fight by a third-round knockout, flooring Hiroshi with a right straight at the 2:45 minute mark.

Morii faced Ilias Ennahachi at KICKBOXING ZONE on November 9, 2014. He won the fight by a first-round knockout, stopping Ennaahachi with a left hook. Morii extended his winning streak to six fights after beating Densiam lookprabat by unanimous decision at NO KICK NO LIFE 2015 on February 11, 2015. Morii next faced Singtongnoi Por.Telakun at WPMF JAPAN×REBELS SUK WEERASAKRECK FAIRTEX on March 22, 2015. He lost the fight by a fifth-round head kick knockout.

ZONE
Morii made his ZONE debut against Maki Pinsiam at ZONE 2 on May 2, 2015. Maki won the fight by majority decision, with scores of 49–47, 48–48 and 49–48. Morii made his second promotional appearance at ZONE 3 on September 13, 2015, against Super Crazy K. He snapped his two-fight losing streak with a first-round technical knockout of K, whom he stopped with repeated low kicks. Morii faced Armin Sasiprapa at Muay Thai Open 33 on December 13, 2015, in his final fight of the year. He won the bout by a third-round knockout.

Morii was booked to face Hikaru Machida at NO KICK NO LIFE 2016 on March 12, 2016. He won the fight by a fourth-round technical knockout. Two months later, on May 1, 2016, Morii participated in the AJFK ZONE super featherweight tournament. He was booked to face Kazu Nakamura in the semifinals of the one-day tournament. Morii won the opening bout by unanimous decision, with scores of 30–27, 30–28 and 30–28. Morii advanced to the tournament finals, where he faced Dynamo☆Ranger. He knocked Ranger down three times by the 1:55 minute mark of the opening round, which earned him an automatic technical knockout victory.

Morii faced Chao Rocket at NO KICK NO LIFE ～THE FINAL～ on June 24, 2016. He won the fight by unanimous decision, with scores of 49–47, 50–47 and 50–46.

KNOCK OUT

Early promotional career
Morii faced Kazuma Takahashi at KNOCK OUT inaugural show, held on September 14, 2016. He won the fight by a first-round knockout, stopping Takahashi with a flurry of punches at the 2:50 minute mark. Morii faced Yodwandee Sawchanatip at KNOCK OUT vol.0 on December 5, 2016. He stopped Yodwandee with a right elbow strike in the second round. Morii's nine fight winning streak was stopped at KNOCK OUT vol.1 on February 12, 2017, as his fight with Hirotoshi Murata was ruled a split decision draw.

Lightweight tournament
Morii participated in the 2017 KNOCK OUT lightweight tournament, held to crown the inaugural champion. Morii faced Keijiro Miyakoshi at KNOCK OUT vol.2 on April 1, 2017, in the tournament quarterfinals. He won the fight by a second-round knockout, stopping Miyakoshi with a flurry of punches 18 seconds into the round. As the semifinals weren't planned to take place until October, Morii fought in two non-tournament bouts. He was first booked to face Juan Mario Kaewsamrit at KNOCK OUT vol.3 on June 17, 2017, whom he beat by a third-round technical knockout. Morii next faced Gi Hoon Joo at KNOCK OUT vol.4 on August 20, 2017. He won the fight by a third-round knockout.

Morii faced Hikaru Machida at KNOCK OUT vol.5 on October 14, 2017, in the semifinal bout of the lightweight tournament. He won the fight by a second-round technical knockout. The fight was stopped on the advice of the ringside doctor, due to a cut above Machida's left eye. Morii advanced to the tournament finals, held at KING OF KNOCK OUT 2017 on December 10, 2017, where he faced Katsuji. He won the fight by a third-round knockout. Aside from winning the tournament, Morii was awarded the KNOCK OUT Lightweight Championship, as well as the ¥3,000,000 prize.

Morii was booked to make his first KNOCK OUT lightweight title defense against the former two-time Rajadamnern Stadium lightweight champion Yodlekpet Or. Pitisak. The bout was booked as the event headliner for KNOCK OUT Sakura Burst, which took place on April 14, 2018, at the Culttz Kawasaki in Kawasaki, Japan. He lost the fight by a second-round technical knockout. The fight was stopped on the advice of the ringside physician at the 1:15 minute mark of the second round, due to a broken nose.

Continued career
After suffering his first loss under the KNOCK OUT banner, Morii was booked to face the former Krush lightweight champion Haruaki Otsuki at KNOCK OUT SUMMER FES.2018 on August 19, 2018. He won the fight by a third-round knockout. Morii next faced Kiyosonsen Flyskygym at KNOCK OUT 2018 cross over on October 7, 2018. He won the fight by knockout, 47 seconds into the extension round. Morii faced Masa Sato at KING OF KNOCK OUT 2018 on December 9, 2018, in his final fight of the year. He won it by a fourth-round knockout, stopping Sato with low kicks.

Morii faced the RISE Super Featherweight champion Chan Hyung Lee at KNOCK OUT 2019 WINTER on February 11, 2019. He lost the fight by a second-round technical knockout. Morii next faced the prospect Kento Haraguchi at JAPAN KICKBOXING INNOVATION on November 17, 2019. He lost the fight by a third-round technical knockout.

NO KICK NO LIFE
Morii made his promotional return to NO KICK NO LIFE against Shoki at NO KICK NO LIFE ~Shin Shou~ on October 29, 2020, following an eleven-month absence from the sport. He won the fight by a third-round technical knockout.

Morii faced Nagasawa Samuel Kiyomitsu at NO KICK NO LIFE ~Shin Shou~ Ungaisouten on February 24, 2021. He won the fight by a majority decision, with scores of 30–28, 29–29 and 30–29. Morii faced Taison Maeguchi at NO KICK NO LIFE Shin Shou Yuigadokuson on July 22, 2021, in his second and final fight of the year. He won the bout by a second-round spinning elbow knockout.

Morii faced the two-time WBC Muaythai Japan welterweight champion Kenta Yamada at the January 9, 2022 NO KICK NO LIFE event. He won the fight by unanimous decision, with scores of 48–47, 50–47 and 50–47.

Morii was booked to face Lom Isan REON at Chakuriki 15 Fujiwara Festival on April 27, 2022. He lost the fight by unanimous decision, after an extra round was fought.

Morii faced Haruto Yasumoto at NO KICK NO LIFE on May 28, 2022. He lost the fight by a third-round knockout.

Titles and accomplishments

Muay thai
WPMF
2010 interim WPMF Japan Featherweight Championship
2011 WPMF Japan Featherweight Championship
One successful title defenseWBC Muaythai2012 WBC Muay Thai Japan Featherweight ChampionshipKNOCK OUT2017 KNOCK OUT Lightweight Tournament Winner
2017 KNOCK OUT Lightweight Championship

KickboxingBigBang2014 BigBang Super Featherweight Championship
One successful title defenseAll Japan Kickboxing Federation2009 AJKF Rookies Cup K-1 Lightweight Tournament runner-up
2016 AJKF ZONE Super Featherweight Tournament WinnerAwardseFight.jp2x Fighter of the Month (January and December 2013)

Fight record

|-  style="text-align:center; background:#fbb"
| 2022-05-28|| Loss ||align=left| Haruto Yasumoto || NO KICK NO LIFE || Tokyo, Japan || KO (High kick) || 3||2:18
|-  style="text-align:center; background:#fbb;"
| 2022-04-27|| Loss ||align=left|  Lom Isan REON || Chakuriki 15 Fujiwara Festival || Tokyo, Japan || Ext. R. Decision (Unanimous) || 4 || 3:00
|-  style="text-align:center; background:#cfc;"
| 2022-01-09|| Win || align=left| Kenta Yamada||  NO KICK NO LIFE || Tokyo, Japan || Decision (Unanimous) ||5 ||3:00
|-  style="background:#cfc;"
| 2021-07-22|| Win || align=left| Taison Maeguchi || NO KICK NO LIFE Shin Shou Yuigadokuson|| Tokyo, Japan || KO (Spinning Elbow) ||2 || 3:00
|-  style="background:#cfc;"
| 2021-02-24 || Win ||align=left| Nagasawa Samuel Kiyomitsu|| NO KICK NO LIFE ~Shin Shou~ Ungaisouten || Tokyo, Japan ||  Decision (Majority) || 3||3:00
|-  style="background:#cfc;"
| 2020-10-29 || Win ||align=left| Shoki Nishikawa|| NO KICK NO LIFE ~Shin Shou~  || Tokyo, Japan ||  TKO (Punches) || 3||0:43
|- style="background:#fbb;"
| 2019-11-17|| Loss || align="left" | Kento Haraguchi ||JAPAN KICKBOXING INNOVATION ||Okayama, Japan|| TKO (High Kick + punches) || 3 || 0:34
|-  style="background:#FFBBBB;"
| 2019-02-11|| Loss ||align=left| Chan Hyung Lee || KNOCK OUT 2019 WINTER || Tokyo, Japan || TKO (Punches)|| 2 || 1:21
|-  bgcolor="#CCFFCC"
| 2018-12-09 || Win||align=left| Masa Sato|| KING OF KNOCK OUT 2018 || Tokyo, Japan || KO (Low Kick) || 4 || 0:33
|-  bgcolor="#CCFFCC"
| 2018-10-07 || Win||align=left| Kiyosonsen Flyskygym || KNOCK OUT 2018 cross over || Tokyo, Japan || KO (Body Punches)|| 6 || 0:47
|-  bgcolor="#CCFFCC"
| 2018-08-19 || Win||align=left| Haruaki Otsuki || KNOCK OUT SUMMER FES.2018 || Tokyo, Japan || KO (Punches) || 3 || 2:52
|-  style="background:#FFBBBB;"
| 2018-04-14|| Loss||align=left| Yodlekpet Or. Pitisak || KNOCK OUT Sakura Burst || Kawasaki, Japan || TKO (Doctor Stop./Broken nose)|| 2 || 1:15 
|-
! style=background:white colspan=9 |
|-  bgcolor="#CCFFCC"
| 2017-12-10 || Win||align=left| Katsuji Takahashi|| KING OF KNOCK OUT 2017, Lightweight Tournament Final || Tokyo, Japan || KO (Punches) || 3 || 1:12  
|-
! style=background:white colspan=9 |
|-  bgcolor="#CCFFCC"
| 2017-10-04 || Win||align=left| Hikaru Machida || KNOCK OUT vol.5, Lightweight Tournament Semi Final || Tokyo, Japan || TKO (Doctor Stoppage/Cut) || 2 || 2:18
|-  bgcolor="#CCFFCC"
| 2017-08-20 || Win||align=left| Gi Hoon Joo || KNOCK OUT vol.4 || Tokyo, Japan || KO (Punches) || 3 || 0:49
|-  bgcolor="#CCFFCC"
| 2017-06-17 || Win||align=left| Juan Mario Kaewsamrit || KNOCK OUT vol.3 || Tokyo, Japan || TKO (Corner Stoppage)|| 3 || 1:19
|-  bgcolor="#CCFFCC"
| 2017-04-01 || Win||align=left| Keijiro Miyakoshi || KNOCK OUT vol.2, Lightweight Tournament Quarter Final || Tokyo, Japan || KO (Punches)|| 2 || 0:18
|-  bgcolor="#c5d2ea"
| 2017-02-12 || Draw||align=left| Hirotoshi Murata || KNOCK OUT vol.1 || Tokyo, Japan || Decision (Split)|| 5 ||3:00
|-  bgcolor="#CCFFCC"
| 2016-12-05 || Win||align=left| Yodwandee Sawchanatip || KNOCK OUT vol.0 || Tokyo, Japan || KO (Right Elbow) || 2 ||1:54
|-  bgcolor="#CCFFCC"
| 2016-09-14 || Win||align=left| Kazuma Takahashi || KNOCK OUT || Tokyo, Japan || KO (Punches) || 1 || 2:50
|-  bgcolor="#CCFFCC"
| 2016-06-24 || Win||align=left| Chao Rocket || NO KICK NO LIFE ～THE FINAL～ || Tokyo, Japan || Decision (Unanimous) || 5 || 3:00
|-  bgcolor="#CCFFCC"
| 2016-05-01 || Win||align=left| Dynamo☆Ranger || ZONE 4, Final || Kanagawa, Japan || TKO (3 Knockdowns)  || 1 || 1:55
|-
! style=background:white colspan=9 |
|-  bgcolor="#CCFFCC"
| 2016-05-01 || Win||align=left| Kazu Nakamura || ZONE 4, Semi Final|| Kanagawa, Japan || Decision (Unanimous) || 3 || 3:00
|-  bgcolor="#CCFFCC"
| 2016-03-12 || Win||align=left| Hikaru Machida || NO KICK NO LIFE 2016 || Tokyo, Japan || TKO (Doctor Stoppage) || 4 || 0:13
|-  bgcolor="#CCFFCC"
| 2015-12-13 || Win||align=left| Armin Sasiprapa || Muay Thai Open 33 || Tokyo, Japan || KO (Left hook to the body)  || 3 ||
|-  bgcolor="#CCFFCC"
| 2015-10-16 || Win||align=left| Cain Brunton || BRUTE FORCE 33 COLLISION || Australia || KO  || 2 ||
|-  bgcolor="#CCFFCC"
| 2015-09-13 || Win||align=left| Super Crazy K || ZONE 3 || Kanagawa, Japan || TKO (Low kicks) || 1 || 2:00
|-  bgcolor="#fbb"
| 2015-05-02 || Loss||align=left| Pinsiam Sor.Amnuaysirichoke || ZONE 2 || Kanagawa, Japan || Decision (Majority)  || 5 || 3:00
|-  style="background:#fbb;"
| 2015-03-22|| Loss ||align=left| Singtongnoi Por.Telakun || WPMF JAPAN×REBELS SUK WEERASAKRECK FAIRTEX || Tokyo, Japan || KO (High Kick) || 5 || 2:40
|-  bgcolor="#CCFFCC"
| 2015-02-11 || Win||align=left| Densiam Lukprabat || NO KICK NO LIFE 2015 || Tokyo, Japan || Decision (Unanimous)  || 5 || 3:00
|-  style="background:#CCFFCC;"
| 2014-11-09 || Win ||align=left| Ilias Ennahachi || KICKBOXING ZONE || Japan || KO (Left Hook) || 1 || 2:40
|-  style="background:#CCFFCC;"
| 2014-09-07 || Win ||align=left| Fire Hiroshi || BigBang 18|| Tokyo, Japan || KO (Straight Right)|| 3 || 2:45
|-
! style=background:white colspan=9 |
|-  bgcolor="#CCFFCC"
| 2014-06-19 || Win||align=left| Rungpet Kaiyanghadao || Fujiwara Matsuri || Japan || KO (Spinning Elbow)  || 2 || 2:15
|-  style="background:#CCFFCC;"
| 2013-12-01 || Win ||align=left| Shunta || BigBang 15|| Tokyo, Japan || KO (Left Hook)|| 5 || 
|-
! style=background:white colspan=9 |
|-  style="background:#CCFFCC;"
| 2013-10-06 || Win ||align=left| Munfang Por.Poonsawan|| MAX MUAYTHAI 2013 JAPAN|| Sendai, Japan || KO (Right hook) || 2 ||
|-  style="background:#fbb;"
| 2013-05-26 || Loss ||align=left| SHIGERU|| M-FIGHT, Part.2|| Tokyo, Japan || Decision (Majority) || 5 || 3:00 
|-
! style=background:white colspan=9 |
|-  style="background:#c5d2ea;"
| 2013-01-06 || Draw ||align=left| Pornsanae Sitmonchai || RISE/M-1 ~Infinity.II~ || Tokyo, Japan || Decision (split) || 5 || 3:00
|- style="background:#fbb;"
| 2012-10-07|| Loss ||align=left| Hiroki Akimoto || MA Japan Kick BREAK-30 ～UNIFICATION～ || Tokyo, Japan || Decision (Unanimous) || 5 ||3:00 
|-
! style=background:white colspan=9 |
|-  style="background:#cfc;"
| 2012-07-29 || Win ||align=left| Hiroki Nagashima|| REBELS 12|| Tokyo, Japan || Decision (Unanimous) || 5 || 3:00 
|-
! style=background:white colspan=9 |
|-  style="background:#cfc;"
| 2012-06-24 || Win ||align=left| Masato Sato|| M-1 Sutt Yod Muaythai vol.2|| Tokyo, Japan || Decision (Unanimous) || 3 || 3:00
|-  style="background:#cfc;"
| 2012-04-29 || Win ||align=left| Heihachi Nakajima|| NJKF KICK TO THE FUTURE 2|| Tokyo, Japan || KO (Punches) || 5 || 2:31
|-
! style=background:white colspan=9 |
|-  style="background:#fbb;"
| 2012-02-24 || Loss ||align=left| Fameechai Sipputar|| Lumpinee Stadium|| Bangkok, Thailand || TKO || 3 ||
|-  style="background:#fbb;"
| 2011-12-22|| Loss ||align=left| Genji Umeno || Fujiwara Matsuri 2011 Fuyu no Jin || Tokyo, Japan || Decision (Decision) || 5 || 3:00
|-  style="background:#cfc;"
| 2011-10-23 || Win ||align=left| Kuwanek Kitakampon|| REBELS 9|| Tokyo, Japan || KO (Knee and puches) || 3 || 1:49
|-  style="background:#cfc;"
| 2011-09-11 || Win ||align=left| Ratanachai Sor Vorapin|| M-1 FAIRTEX RAORAK　MUAY vol.3|| Japan || KO (Right low kick) || 1 || 2:09
|-  style="background:#c5d2ea;"
| 2011-06-12 || Draw ||align=left| Suwannoi Acegym|| M-1 FAIRTEX RAORAK　MUAY vol.2|| Japan || Decision (Split) || 5 || 3:00
|-  style="background:#cfc;"
| 2011-04-10 || Win ||align=left| Hiroki Nagashima|| M-1 FAIRTEX RAORAK　MUAY vol.1|| Japan || TKO (Doctor stoppage) || 5 || 2:02
|-
! style=background:white colspan=9 |
|-  style="background:#cfc;"
| 2010-12-01 || Win ||align=left| Reio|| Fujiwara Matsuri 2010|| Japan || TKO (Three knockdowns) || 1 || 2:55
|-
! style=background:white colspan=9 |
|-  style="background:#cfc;"
| 2010-09-12 || Win ||align=left| Ryo Pegasus|| M-1 FAIRTEX　Singha Beer Muay Thai Challenge NAI KANOMTOM vol.3|| Japan || Decision (Unanimous) || 3 || 3:00
|-  style="background:#cfc;"
| 2010-06-06 || Win ||align=left| Kompayak Weerasakreck|| M-1 RAJA BOXING SINGHA BEER Muay Thai Challenge NAI KANOMTOM vol.2|| Japan || Decision (Unanimous) || 3 || 3:00
|-  style="background:#cfc;"
| 2010-03-28 || Win ||align=left| Kenshiro Chiba|| Tanikawa Gym 25th Anivversary BigBang|| Japan || KO (Right hook) || 2 || 0:55
|-  style="background:#cfc;"
| 2009-12-11 || Win ||align=left| Hideya Nagasaki|| Fujiwara Matsuri 2009|| Japan || Decision (Unanimous) || 3 || 3:00
|-  style="background:#cfc;"
| 2009-10-12 || Win ||align=left| Hiroshi Iwakiri|| Krush-EX ～Innocent Fighter～|| Japan || Decision (Unanimous) || 3 || 3:00
|-  style="background:#cfc;"
| 2009-07-24 || Win ||align=left| Takeyuki|| Krush Lightweight Grand Prix 2009～ Round.1|| Japan || Decision (Unanimous) || 3 || 3:00
|-  style="background:#cfc;"
| 2009-06-21 || Win ||align=left| Makoto Kushima|| AJKF Norainu Dengekisakusen 2009|| Japan || TKO (Doctor Stoppage) || 3 || 2:21
|-  style="background:#fbb;"
| 2009-03-14 || Loss ||align=left| Takuya Shirahama|| AJKF Krush 2, Rookies Cup ～K-1 Rule 60kg Tournament Final|| Japan || Decision (Unanimous) || 3 || 3:00
|-
! style=background:white colspan=9 |
|-  style="background:#cfc;"
| 2009-02-01 || Win ||align=left| Mitsutoshi Kurata|| AJKF Krush, Rookies Cup ～K-1 Rule 60kg Tournament Semi Final|| Japan || TKO (Right hook to the body) || 2 || 2:47
|-  style="background:#cfc;"
| 2009-02-01 || Win ||align=left| Rikiya Oomae|| AJKF Krush, Rookies Cup ～K-1 Rule 60kg Tournament Quarter Final|| Japan || Decision (Unanimous) || 3 || 3:00
|-  style="background:#cfc;"
| 2008-12-05 || Win ||align=left| Takahiro Horiguchi||AJKF Fujiwara Matsuri 2008|| Japan || Decision (Unanimous) || 3 || 3:00
|-  style="background:#cfc;"
| 2008-10-03 || Win ||align=left| Hayato Uesugi||AJKF Fighting Base 2|| Japan || Decision (Unanimous) || 3 || 3:00
|-  style="background:#cfc;"
| 2008-08-22 || Win ||align=left| Fudo Myo-o||AJKF Fighting Base 1|| Japan || KO (Left hook) || 2 || 1:49
|-  style="background:#cfc;"
| 2008-06-22 || Win ||align=left| Rikiya Oomae||AJKF Norainu Dengekisakusen|| Japan || Decision (Unanimous) || 3 || 3:00
|-  style="background:#cfc;"
| 2008-04-06 || Win ||align=left| Yuichiro Katsumata||M-1 FAIRTEX SINGHA BEERFreshmans in Oomori|| Japan || Decision (Unanimous) || 3 || 3:00
|-  style="background:#c5d2ea;"
| 2008-02-09 || Draw||align=left| Koki Oonishi||AJKF CUB☆KICK’S－9|| Japan || Decision (Majority) || 3 || 3:00
|-
| colspan=9 | Legend''':

See also
 List of male kickboxers

References

Living people
1988 births
Japanese male kickboxers
Japanese Muay Thai practitioners
Sportspeople from Nagano Prefecture